The Tegene is a river in the Aktobe Region and Karaganda Region, Kazakhstan.

The Tegene flows wholly across uninhabited territory. Its basin is used seasonally for livestock grazing, before the burnout of the grass in the summer. The name of the river originated in the Kazakh language word for "bowl".

Course
The river originates in springs located in the Mashay Kemer. In its first stretch it flows roughly westwards to the north of the Saryapankum Sands. Halfway through its course the river describes a wide bend and flows northwards, bending again to the west in its final stretch. The Tegene has its mouth in the northwestern end of the Shalkarteniz endorheic lake, to the north of the mouth of the Zhyngyldyozek.

The river is fed by the winter snows and flows only in the spring. In the summer it dries up.

See also
List of rivers of Kazakhstan

References

Rivers of Kazakhstan
Shalkarteniz basin